Ernst Theodor Vilhelm Nilsson (September 22, 1901 – January 6, 1977) was a Danish association football player, who played 40 games and scored eight goals for the Danish national team from 1920 to 1937. Born in Copenhagen, Nilsson played as a forward for Copenhagen club B 1903.

Nilsson was the first Danish national team player to be sent off, during a June 1928 match against Norwegian national team.

External links
Danish national team profile
Haslund.info profile

1901 births
1977 deaths
Danish men's footballers
Denmark international footballers
Danish people of Swedish descent
Boldklubben 1903 players
Association football forwards
Footballers from Copenhagen